KC-TV Tower is a  high freestanding steel lattice tower located at East 31st Street on Union Hill (south of downtown) in Kansas City, Missouri.

History

Construction on what would then be KCMO-TV's transmitter and the highest free-standing steel tower (without guy lines) in the world began in 1955. In February 1956 the first signal was emitted by antennas on the tower. Construction costs were $420,000; 600 tons of steel and 26,000 screws were used. The vertical cantilever construction is 24.38 m wide at the base. At the time of its completion  the KCTV Tower was the third tallest freestanding structure in the world behind only the Empire State Building and the Chrysler Building and had surpassed  the Eiffel Tower by 18 feet becoming the tallest tower in the world of any kind.

The KCTV tower has become a widely recognized Kansas City landmark, in large part because of the string lights that adorn the four corners of the structure's frame, which can be seen for miles around the immediate metropolitan area at night. It is so recognized that KCTV incorporated the "tall tower" – as the station referred to it on-air – into the logo it adopted as part of an imaging revamp in November 1999 (at which time, it also adopted the current KCTV 5 News identity as the title for its newscasts), which remained in use until May 2002. The tower is owned by the private television broadcaster KCTV and is right next to its studios on 31st Street in 125 East Kansas City. KCTV is the regional partner of CBS in Kansas City and now broadcasts its programs digitally (digital channel 24.3, HDTV 1080i). The striking transmission tower has long served as a trademark in the transmitter's logo.

The tower itself is of the same design as the   transmission tower on which ABC affiliate KQTV upstate in St. Joseph (which, coincidentally, also began broadcasting on the date KCTV commenced operations, September 27, 1953) maintains its transmitter antenna and the  WTVR TV Tower in Richmond, Virginia. Both of which were completed three years earlier in 1953.

The tower is an integral part of the Kansas City cityscape and part of the city's history. In 1972 two activists climbed to the top of the tower to protest the Vietnam War. They remained on the structure for 14 hours. The otherwise illuminated tower remained dark during the 1973 oil crisis in order to urge the city's citizens to save energy. In the 1980s, there were serious considerations to redesign the tower to look like a gigantic saxophone to commemorate the legacy of jazz in Kansas. Falling icicles have damaged nearby buildings in the vicinity of the KCTV tower. From the 1970s until 2001, the tower also served as a weather beacon to signal residents and visitors of inclement weather affecting Kansas City and its immediate surrounding communities. For this purpose, station engineers switched individual sets of lights on the tower and modified them to flash when a severe weather watch or warning was issued for any county in the immediate Kansas City area by the local National Weather Service Forecast Office or the National Severe Storms Forecast Center/Storm Prediction Center, activating them in descending order – in one or more of three sections – in pertinence to the specific weather situation:
 Lights flashing on the top third of the tower indicated that a severe thunderstorm watch, tornado watch or winter weather advisory was in effect
 Lights flashing on the top two-thirds of the tower indicated that a severe thunderstorm warning or winter storm warning was in effect
 Lights flashing on all sections of the tower indicated that a tornado warning was in effect or that highly threatening weather would occur

After the terrorist attacks on the World Trade Center and The Pentagon on September 11, 2001, as symbols of American patriotism were heavily embraced in their immediate aftermath, KCTV engineers installed LED lights on the tower to correspond to the colors of the United States flag, placing red lights on the top third, white lights on the middle third and blue lights on the bottom third of the structure. In 2004, the lights on the tower were turned off entirely until all of the bulbs could be replaced; the lights on the tower were reactivated on July 1, 2006, with white lights having been installed on all of its sections, as had originally been standard until the 1970s. Since then, the lights have not flashed for the purpose of being a notifier of inclement weather conditions as they did prior to September 11, 2001.

In 2015, a non-profit called The Tower KC, Inc. was founded with the goal of re-lighting the tower as a public art piece. The project includes Kansas City Art Institute faculty member James Woodfill as lead artist and José Faus as lead community engagement artist, with Tower KC founder Jasper Mullarney and Kansas City architecture company El Dorado Inc. providing management for the project. The concept (titled Seeing the Night Bluely by Woodfill) is to capture the colors of the sky every day—from sunrise to sunset, bright blue or overcast—and reproduce them on the tower at night in a minutes-long repeating loop, utilizing LEDs. The Tower KC claims that once live, this installation will be the tallest public art piece in the world.

Tower tenants
KCTV is the only station broadcast from the tower.

See also 
 Lattice tower
 List of tallest towers in the world
 List of tallest freestanding structures in the world
 List of tallest freestanding steel structures
 List of famous transmission sites

References

Lattice towers